China Railway Hohhot Group, officially abbreviated as CR Hohhot or CR-Hohhot, formerly, Hohhot Railway Administration is a subsidiaries company under the jurisdiction of the China Railway (formerly the Ministry of Railway). It supervises the railway network within central Inner Mongolia. The railway administration was reorganized as a company in November 2017.

Hub stations
 Hohhot
 
 Baotou
 , 
 Ulanqab
 Jining
 Erenhot

References

Rail transport in Inner Mongolia
 
China Railway Corporation